Ohman or Öhman is a surname. Notable people with the surname include:

Conny Öhman  (1950–2010), Swedish politician
Ivar Öhman (1914–1989), Swedish journalist and diplomat
Jack Ohman (born 1960), American editorial cartoonist
Jarl Öhman (1891–1936), Finnish footballer
Ole Öhman (born 1973), Swedish drummer
Mark Ohman, American oceanographer
Phil Ohman (1896–1954), American film composer
Will Ohman (born 1977), baseball player